Bret James Loehr (born July 9, 1993) is an American actor. Loehr is most known for playing Timmy York in the 2003 horror film Identity, and for playing Tanner Shackleton in the Fox sitcom Cracking Up (2004–06).

Career

Television

Film

References

External links

1993 births
People from Tarzana, Los Angeles
21st-century American male actors
American male child actors
American male film actors
American male television actors
Male actors from Los Angeles
Living people